Valea Nouă may refer to the following rivers in Romania:

 Valea Nouă (Teuz), a tributary of the Teuz in Arad County
 Valea Nouă (Crișul Negru), a tributary of the Crișul Negru in Bihor County
 Valea Nouă Chișer, a tributary of the Crișul Alb in Arad County